Igensdorf is a municipality in the district of Forchheim in Bavaria in Germany.

Twin towns
Igensdorf is twinned with:

  Saint-Martin-la-Plaine, France, since 1992

References

Forchheim (district)